Hafeez Tahir (born 2 September 1947) is a Pakistani TV producer, director, poet and writer. He was the director of popular children's TV serial Ainak Wala Jin (1993).

Early life and career
Hafeez Tahir was born in Lahore, Pakistan on 2nd of September 1947 and received most of his education in Lahore. He went to Islamia College Railway Road, Islamia College Civil LInes followed by National College of Arts and then the University of the Punjab, Lahore. He got his master's degrees in Administrative Science and Urdu literature. 
Politically, he was a founding member of Pakistan Peoples Party in 1967.  

He joined PTV in 1980 after encouragement from the veteran TV actor Farooq Zameer. He first worked there as a production assistant. Hafeez Tahir then went on to work for PTV for 27 years as Programs Producer and retired in 2007 as Executive Producer.

Books
Aathwaan Rang (1980)
Zair-e-Zameen (1993)
Manzil Manzil (2017)

PTV Award
Pakistan Television (PTV) 'Director of the Decade' Award won by Hafeez Tahir for Ainak Wala Jin (TV series).

References

External links
 Hafeez Tahir on IMDb website

1947 births
Living people
Punjabi people
University of the Punjab alumni
Pakistan Television Corporation people
Pakistani television producers
Pakistani television directors
Pakistani novelists
Urdu-language novelists
PTV Award winners